Juillé may refer to the following places in France:

 Juillé, Charente, a commune in the Charente department
 Juillé, Sarthe, a commune in the Sarthe department
 Juillé, Deux-Sèvres, a commune in the Deux-Sèvres department